Leptoypha is a genus of lace bugs in the family Tingidae. There are about 17 described species in Leptoypha.

Species
These 17 species belong to the genus Leptoypha:

References

Further reading

 
 
 
 
 
 
 
 
 
 
 

Tingidae